Tamara Divišková (born 9 July 1934, in Brno) is a Czech ceramist and costume designer. During her career, she has collaborated with the National Theatre in Brno, among other institutions. She is the sister of the actress Nina Divíšková.

References

External links 
 Tamara Divišková - Official website 
Tamara Divišková at the Encyklopedie dějin města Brna 

1934 births
Living people
20th-century Czech women artists
Czech ceramists
Czech women ceramists
Artists from Brno